The fourth season of the ITV1 television series Benidorm, which is a sitcom set in an all-inclusive holiday resort (The Solana), began broadcasting on 25 February 2011, consisting of six episodes. The entire series was directed by Sandy Johnson and written by Derren Litten. Multiple changes occurred within the cast this series, which saw the introductions of Shelley Longworth as Sam Wood, Tony Maudsley as Kenneth Du Beke, Kathryn Drysdale as Natalie Jones, Adam Gillen as Liam Conroy and Selina Griffiths as Pauline Mahmood. Furthermore, Tim Healy re-joined the cast, now on a permanent basis, whereas Cilla Black, Denise Welch, Bananarama, and Melvyn Hayes made brief guest appearances. Returning from the third series were the Garvey family, consisting of Mick (Steve Pemberton), Janice (Siobhan Finneran), Michael (Oliver Stokes) and Janice's mother Madge Barron (Sheila Reid); swingers Donald (Kenny Ireland) and Jacqueline Stewart (Janine Duvitski); Noreen Maltby (Elsie Kelly); homosexual couple Gavin (Hugh Sachs) and Troy Ramsbottom (Paul Bazely), though Bazely only appeared in the series finale; and Solana staff Mateo Castellanos (Jake Canuso) and manageress Janey York (Crissy Rock).

Overall, the series received an average viewership of 7.77 million, the highest in the programme's history, with the opening episode being watched by 8.61 million. The series concluded on 8 April 2011, with the series finale attracting 7.82 million viewers. The fourth series was initially supposed to be the final series to air, as Litten wanted to conclude writing new material, though high ratings and critical demand resulted in a fifth series being produced, airing in 2012.

Cast 
 Steve Pemberton as Mick Garvey
 Siobhan Finneran as Janice Garvey
 Sheila Reid as Madge Harvey
 Oliver Stokes as Michael Garvey
 Kenny Ireland as Donald Stewart
 Janine Duvitski as Jacqueline Stewart
 Elsie Kelly as Noreen Maltby (episodes 2–6)
 Hugh Sachs as Gavin Ramsbottom
 Jake Canuso as Mateo Castellanos
 Crissy Rock as Janey Yorke
 Tim Healy as Les/Lesley Conroy
 Adam Gillen as Liam Conroy
 Shelley Longworth as Sam Wood
 Tony Maudsley as Kenneth De Beke
 Kathryn Drysdale as Natalie Jones
 Selina Griffiths as Pauline Mahmood (episodes 2–6)
 Paul Bazely as Troy Ramsbottom (episode 6)

Episodes

Reception 
Throughout the series' run, the show commanded an average of 7.77 million viewers – a sharp 1.25 million increase from the previous season. Critically, the first episode broke the still-standing ratings record for the show.

Similarly, at the time of broadcast, Metro reported the interest of holidays to Benidorm increase 159% upon the show's airing.

The fourth series was nominated for Best Situation Comedy at the 17th National Television Awards, eventually losing out to Outnumbered. Similarly, the show was also nominated for a TV Quick Award.

Home media 
The DVD of the fourth series was released on 14 November 2011.

References

Notes

External links 
 

2011 British television seasons
Benidorm (TV series)